The South African Railways Class 6F  of 1900 was a steam locomotive from the pre-Union era in the Cape of Good Hope.

In 1900, two redesigned 6th Class  steam locomotives were placed in service by the Cape Government Railways. In 1912, when they were assimilated into the South African Railways, they were renumbered and designated .

Manufacturer
The original 6th Class  passenger steam locomotive was designed at the Salt River works of the Cape Government Railways (CGR) in 1893, at the same time as the 7th Class and both according to the specifications of Michael Stephens, then Chief Locomotive Superintendent of the CGR, and under the supervision of H.M. Beatty, then Locomotive Superintendent of the Western System.

The two 6th Class locomotives which entered service on the CGR in 1900 were built by Sharp, Stewart and Company, numbered 260 and 261 and allocated to the Western System. They were equipped with large commodious cabs, which were to become standard in all subsequent designs. They differed in appearance from all previous 6th Class locomotives by having higher mounted running boards without coupled wheel fairings. They proved to be good engines and were better steamers.

These engines reflected the decision by Beatty, who had succeeded Michael Stephens as Chief Locomotive Superintendent in 1895, to adopt bar frames for future CGR locomotives. He thereby demonstrated that, while still keeping to the good points of the locomotives he had designed under Stephens' supervision, he was preparing to adopt his own ideas in his future locomotive designs.

Class 6 sub-classes
When the Union of South Africa was established on 31 May 1910, the three Colonial government railways (CGR, Natal Government Railways and Central South African Railways) were united under a single administration to control and administer the railways, ports and harbours of the Union. Although the South African Railways and Harbours came into existence in 1910, the actual classification and renumbering of all the rolling stock of the three constituent railways were only implemented with effect from 1 January 1912.

When these two locomotives were assimilated into the South African Railways (SAR) in 1912, they were renumbered 604 and 605 and designated Class 6F.

The rest of the CGR's 6th Class locomotives, together with 6th Class locomotives which had been inherited from the Oranje-Vrijstaat Gouwerment-Spoorwegen (OVGS) via the Imperial Military Railways (IMR) and the Central South African Railways (CSAR), were grouped into thirteen more sub-classes by the SAR. The  locomotives became SAR Classes 6, 6A to 6E, 6G, 6H and 6J to 6L, the  locomotives became Class 6Y and the  locomotives became Class 6Z.

Service
The Class 6 series of locomotives were introduced primarily as passenger locomotives, but when the class became displaced by larger and more powerful locomotive classes, it literally became a Jack-of-all-trades which proved itself as one of the most useful and successful locomotive classes ever to be designed at the Salt River shops. It went on to see service in all parts of the country, except in Natal, and was used on all types of traffic.

The two Class 6F locomotives were placed in service on the Cape mainline. Compared to most of the rest of the Class 6 family, they had a relatively short lifespan of less than thirty years and were withdrawn from service by 1929.

References

1370
1370
4-6-0 locomotives
2′C n2 locomotives
Sharp Stewart locomotives
Cape gauge railway locomotives
Railway locomotives introduced in 1900
1900 in South Africa
Scrapped locomotives